USS Meredith (DD-726), an , was the third ship of the United States Navy to be named for Jonathan Meredith, a Marine sergeant who saved the life of Lieutenant John Trippe of Vixen, during the Barbary Wars.

Meredith was laid down on 26 July 1943 by Bath Iron Works Corporation, Bath, Maine; launched on 21 December 1943, sponsored by Mrs. William Kopper; and commissioned on 14 March 1944.

Service history
After shakedown off Bermuda, Meredith departed Boston on 8 May 1944 as an escort in a convoy, arriving Plymouth, England, on the 27th. Between 5 and 6 June, she served as escort to transports assembling for the Normandy invasion. On 6 June, Meredith gave gunfire support to the landing forces on Utah Beach. Early in the morning of the following day, while patrolling the offshore waters as a screening vessel, she struck a mine. Severely damaged, with a loss of seven killed and over 50 wounded and missing, Meredith was towed to an anchorage in the Baie de la Seine to be salvaged. However, on the morning of 9 June, her seams were further opened by an enemy bombing raid and shortly after she broke in two without warning and sank.  rescued 163 survivors.

On 5 August 1960, the sunken hulk was sold to St. Française de Recherches of France.  The hulk of the Meredith was raised and scrapped in September 1960.

Awards
Meredith received one battle star for World War II service.

References

External links
navsource.org: USS Meredith
hazegray.org: USS Meredith

 

World War II destroyers of the United States
Destroyers sunk by aircraft
Ships built in Bath, Maine
1943 ships
Allen M. Sumner-class destroyers of the United States Navy
Maritime incidents in June 1944
Ships sunk by German aircraft
Ships sunk by mines